New Zealand competed in the 2017 Asian Winter Games in Sapporo and Obihiro, Japan from 19 to 26 February. This marked the debut of the country at the Asian Winter Games, however New Zealand athletes were not eligible to win any medals, as they were classified as guest competitors.

New Zealand competed in one sport (two disciplines) and the team consisted of three male athletes.

Competitors
The following table lists the Chinese delegation per sport and gender.

Short track speed skating

Speed skating

New Zealand's speed skating team consisted of one male athlete.

Man

References

Nations at the 2017 Asian Winter Games
Asian Winter Games
New Zealand at the Asian Winter Games